Yellowstone is a summer village in Alberta, Canada. It is developed on the northern shore of Lac Ste. Anne, south of Alberta Highway 43, between Ross Haven and Gunn,  from Edmonton.

Demographics 

In the 2016 Census of Population conducted by Statistics Canada, the Summer Village of Yellowstone had a population of 137 living in 63 of its 145 total private dwellings, a  change from its 2011 population of 124.

The Summer Village of Yellowstone's 2012 municipal census counted a population of 131.

See also 
List of communities in Alberta
List of summer villages in Alberta
List of resort villages in Saskatchewan

References

External links 

1965 establishments in Alberta
Lac Ste. Anne County
Summer villages in Alberta